Rhys Davies (born 9 November 1998) is a Welsh international rugby union player, who currently plays for Ospreys. He plays as a lock.

Club career
Born in Swansea, Davies was part of the Ospreys academy setup until he was 16, when he accepted a scholarship to attend Millfield school in Street, Somerset. He spent two years representing Bath's underage teams, before signing a three-year academy contract with the Premiership Rugby club ahead of the 2017–18 season. Davies will return to Ospreys on a two-year contract ahead of the 2020–21 season.

International career
Davies was called up to play for Wales in the 2021 Autumn internationals.

On 14 November 2022, Davies was called up for Wales as injury cover in the 2022 Autumn Internationals.

Davies was once again called up by Wales on 17 January 2023, as part of the squad for the 2023 Six Nations Championship. He made his debut on 11 February 2023, coming off the bench against Scotland.

References

External links

Bath Academy Profile

1998 births
Living people
Bath Rugby players
Rugby union locks
Rugby union players from Swansea
Welsh rugby union players
Ospreys (rugby union) players
People educated at Millfield
Wales international rugby union players